Anna Comarella (born 12 March 1997) is an Italian cross-country skier. She competed in the women's 15 kilometre skiathlon at the 2018 Winter Olympics.

Cross-country skiing results
All results are sourced from the International Ski Federation (FIS).

Olympic Games

World Championships

World Cup

Season standings

References

External links
 

1997 births
Living people
Italian female cross-country skiers
Tour de Ski skiers
Olympic cross-country skiers of Italy
Cross-country skiers at the 2018 Winter Olympics
Cross-country skiers at the 2022 Winter Olympics
Place of birth missing (living people)
Cross-country skiers of Fiamme Oro